Nicholas Smith Jr. (born April 18, 2004) is an American college basketball player and current member of the Arkansas Razorbacks of the Southeastern Conference (SEC). He attended North Little Rock High School in North Little Rock, Arkansas during his senior year of high school, where he was named the #1 overall recruit in the class of 2022.

High school career
Smith originally attended Sylvan Hills High School in Sherwood, Arkansas before transferring to North Little Rock High School in North Little Rock, Arkansas prior to his senior year. He was the Arkansas Democrat-Gazette All-Arkansas Preps Boys Underclassman of the Year his sophomore year, and Player of the Year his junior and senior seasons. After leading North Little Rock High to a 26-3 record and the Arkansas Class 6A state championship, Smith was selected to play in the 2022 McDonald's All-American Boys Game and the Jordan Brand Classic.

Recruiting
Smith was a consensus five-star recruit and one of the top players in the 2022 class, according to major recruiting services. On September 29, 2021, he committed to being on the college basketball team for the Arkansas Razorbacks, over other finalists Alabama, Auburn and Arkansas–Pine Bluff. Smith also received offers from Oklahoma, Georgetown, Kansas, North Carolina, Baylor, Florida, Butler, Kentucky, Oklahoma State, Texas, and Tennessee. Smith was a consensus top five recruit nationally and was named the #1 overall recruit in the 2022 class by 247Sports.

College Career
Smith was projected to be a starting guard for the Arkansas Razorbacks for the 2022-23 season, though a persistent knee injury kept him sidelined for the majority of the season. Smith has only appeared in seven games this season, scoring a total of 69 points during 141 minutes of playing time. Smith is projected to be a lottery pick in the 2023 NBA draft.

References

External links
Arkansas Razorbacks bio
USA Basketball bio

2004 births
Living people
American men's basketball players
Arkansas Razorbacks men's basketball players
Basketball players from Arkansas
McDonald's High School All-Americans
People from Jacksonville, Arkansas
Point guards
Shooting guards